Satloff is a surname. Notable people with the surname include:

Dustin Satloff (born 1993), American entrepreneur, son of James
James Satloff (born 1962), American businessman
Robert Satloff (born 1962), American foreign policy author